The Brother/Sister Plays is a triptych of plays written by American playwright Tarell Alvin McCraney.

Overview
Over the course of three years, McCraney wrote the Brother/Sister Plays while studying at Yale. He describes them as a triptych rather than a trilogy, saying in an interview with Young Vic Theatre: "Each play began a different way – inspired by my brothers and sisters and all of them are dedicated to them. They are about interconnected relationships and the complexities of those." The triptych consists of In the Red and Brown Water, The Brothers Size, and Marcus; Or the Secret of Sweet. Although McCraney actually wrote The Brothers Size first, it is the second installment. 
Tarell Alvin McCraney was born in Liberty City, Florida, on 17 October 1980. He focused on the arts at a young age, studying at the New World School of the Arts High School where he was awarded both the Dean’s Award for Theatre and the Exemplary Artist Award. He went on to DePaul University, graduating with a BFA in Acting, and continuing to Yale School of Drama for an MFA in Playwriting.

Synopsis

A. In The Red and Brown Water 

The main character of In The Red and Brown Water is Oya, a young woman who is a talented track runner. She sacrifices her ambition and a full ride scholarship to state university to stay home with her dying Mother. Oya’s life quickly becomes about relationships. An adoring young man and hard worker with a stutter, Ogun, is in love with Oya, but she is unable to resist the advances of the passionate “bad boy” Shango. Soon, Shango goes to war, and Oya moves in with Ogun. A long time friend, Elegba, visits Oya throughout her narrative and after learning he has fathered a child, Oya realizes that she is unable to have children. She pushes Ogun away at the same time that Shango returns, and shortly after, Oya learns he has impregnated a local girl, Shun. With no career and the inability to live up to societal expectations of being a mother, Oya spirals into madness to the point where she cuts off her ear in order to prove her love to Shango.

B. The Brothers Size 

Set a few years later, we meet Ogun’s brother Oshoosi, who has recently been released from prison. Ogun is a hardworking man who does not want to see him go back to jail. He unsuccessfully tries to ground his free-spirited brother, whose only dream is buying a car and driving somewhere far away. While Ogun tries to get Oshoosi on the right track, Elegba, Oshoosi’s prison mate and occasional lover, just wants to have fun. He gifts Oshoosi with a car and the two go for a ride, but Elegba neglects to tell him that he is carrying cocaine in his duffel bag. A power hungry local sheriff discovers Elegba’s cocaine and instead of staying to face charges, Oshoosi runs home to Ogun. Ogun convinces his brother to run away, saying he will deny his brother’s existence when the police arrive. Oshoosi ends up fleeing to Mexico.

C. Marcus; Or the Secret of Sweet 

Marcus; Or the Secret of Sweet is set several years in the future and introduces Elegba’s son, Marcus. Marcus is 16 and after having a dream in which Oshoosi comes to him, he seeks to discover what similarities he has with his recently deceased father. On the journey to learn more about his past, Marcus learns a surprising amount about himself as well. He meets Shua, a young man who has just moved into the area, who forces him to explore his own sexuality.

Influences

A. Yoruba 

The Brother/Sister Plays have many Yoruba influences. These three plays are based on traditional Yoruba stories. This culture was brought to America during the slave trade, and later on by Nigerian immigrants and is said to be the largest existing religion to originate from Africa. A large part of this religion is based on the worship of deities, called Orisha. It is believed that the ancestor Oduduwa fell from the sky bringing Yoruba to Aye (the Earth). Within this religion, all humans have Ayanmo, or destiny, giving them the chance to become one with Oduduwa's father, the Almighty 
Olodumare, which is the ultimate goal. 

Many of the characters within the Brother/Sister Plays share names with different Orisha. In In the Red and Brown Water, Oya shares her name with the goddess of wind — representative of sudden change, 
Elegba shares his name with the Orisha symbolizing cross roads and choices and Shun’s name comes from Orisha Oshun, the goddess of love. In The Brothers Size, another three characters share names with Yoruba Orishas: Ogun; the god of iron working, Oshoosi; the divine hunter associated with the human struggle for survival, and again, Elegba.

B. Louisiana 

Much of the influence for this triptych also came from southern Louisiana. All three of the plays are set in the fictional town of San Pere, Louisiana; McCraney was raised in the Louisiana projects near the Bayou. One can see the mirroring of socio-political issues of the area in the Brother/Sister Plays like violence and crime, civil rights, racism, drag culture, etc.) Now while these are problems prevalent in the south, they are not invisible to the rest of the country. 35.2% of Louisiana’s population is African Americans, the second largest in the country; and while great strides have been made since the Civil Rights Movement in the 1960s, African Americans still face larger social and economic consequences than their White counterparts. 40% of African Americans under the age of 16 live in poverty, African-American men are seven times more likely to be murdered than Caucasian men, and 65% of African-American children grow up in single-parent homes. These issues are all reflected in McCraney’s plays with the absence of Oya’s father and Elegba’s son’s mother in In the Red and Brown Water, and the imprisonment of Elegba and Oshoosi for small scale crimes in The Brothers Size.

Productions 

A. The Brother Sister Plays

B. In the Red and Brown Water 

C. The Brothers Size 

D. Marcus; Or the Secret of Sweet

See also 
Yoruba Americans
Louisiana
Hurricane Katrina
Tarell Alvin McCraney
Young Vic
The Public Theater

References

1. Billington, Michael. "Theatre Review: In the Red and Brown Water / Young Vic, London." The Guardian, 09 Oct. 2008. Web. 14 Mar. 2016. 
2. "The Brother/Sister Plays Audience Reaction.” YouTube. Public Theatre, 9 Nov. 2009. Web. 14 Mar. 2016. 
3. Fisher, Philip. "Theatre Review: In the Red and Brown Water at Young Vic." Theatre Review: In the Red and Brown Water at Young Vic. British Theatre Guide, 2008. Web. 14 Mar. 2016. 
4. Goldfield, David R. Black, White, and Southern: Race Relations and Southern Culture, 1940 to the Present. Baton Rouge: Louisiana State UP, 1990. Print. 
5. Hall, Gwendolyn Midlo. Africans in Colonial Louisiana: The Development of AfroCreole Culture in the Eighteenth Century. Baton Rouge: Louisiana State UP, 1992. Print. 
6. Love, Velma E. Divining the Self: A Study in Yoruba Myth and Human Consciousness. University Park, PA: Pennsylvania State UP, 2012. Print. 
7. McCraney, Tarell Alvin. The Brother/Sister Plays. New York: Theatre Communications Group, 2010. Print. 
8. McCraney, Tarell Alvin. "Tarell Alvin McCraney: How to Endure Imposterphobia." Broadway Buzz.
Broadway.com, 30 Oct. 2007. Web. 14 Mar. 2016. 
9. Parrinder, Geoffrey. West African Religion: Illustrated from the Beliefs and Practices of the Yoruba, Ewe, Akan, and Kindred Peoples. London: Epworth, 1949. Print. 
10. "Tarell Alvin McCraney." New Dramatists, n.d. Web. 14 Mar. 2016.

External links 
  Words on Plays. ACT-SF.org. Web. 16 Apr. 2016. 
  The Brothers Size. seattlerep.org. Seattle Repertory Theatre. Web. 16 Apr. 2016.

American plays